Ingerman (Ingram, Enguerrand) (c. 750-818), was a Frankish noble and Count of Hesbaye, son of Sigram of Hesbaye and grandson of Sigramnus of Hesbaye.

Ingerman married Rotrude, of unknown parentage. Ingerman and Rotrude had one daughter:
 Ermengarde. She married into the Frankish royal family, the Carolingians and was the first wife of King Louis the Pious, Son of Charlemagne.

Primary sources mentioning Ingoram

There seems to be only one primary source directly mentioning Ingoram. 

In a medieval life story of Emperor Louis the Pious, by Thegan of Trier, Louis's wife Ermengarde is said to be a daughter of the noble duke Ingorammus, who was son of a brother of Hruotgangi "sancti pontificis". This in turn is believed to refer to Saint Chrodegang, the Bishop of Metz. 

Chrodegang in turn was named in one medieval record as having parents who were nobles from Hasbania (Hesbaye).

References

Sources

Counts of Hesbaye
8th-century Frankish nobility
750s births
818 deaths
Year of birth uncertain